Perpetuum mobile is a term for music characterised by a continuous steady stream of notes or repetition.

Perpetuum Mobile may also refer to:

Music
Perpetuum Mobile (album), an album by Einsturzende Neubauten
Perpetuum mobile, Telemann Ouvertüre in D TWV 55:D12
Perpetuum mobile, Arvo Pärt
Perpetuum Mobile, Op. 257 Johann Strauss II
Perpetuum mobile, Busoni
Perpetuum mobile, Tchaikovsky
"Perpetuum Mobile", a 1987 single from the Penguin Cafe Orchestra

Science
 Perpetuum mobile, another term for perpetual motion machine

Organizations
 Perpetuum Mobile (organization), a curatorial organization